Anthrenus fuscus is a species of carpet beetle in the family Dermestidae. It is found in North America and Europe.

References

Further reading

External links

 

Anthrenus
Articles created by Qbugbot
Beetles described in 1789